Eric Eastwood may refer to:
 Eric Eastwood (footballer) (1916–1991), British footballer
 Sir Eric Eastwood (engineer) (1910–1981), British engineer and Fellow of the Royal Society